The 1951–52 British Home Championship was an international football tournament played between the British Home Nations during the 1951–52 season. In an unusual conclusion, Wales shared the championship with England, one of only four tournaments Wales would share victory in post-war. Ireland by contrast endured one of their worst championships of the period, losing all three games and failing to score. Scotland too underperformed, although their two losses were both hard-fought.

Scotland had kicked off the competition with an easy victory over Ireland in the first match. England and Wales by contrast split the points, failing to breach a 1–1 draw at Ninian Park. England exerted their authority over the Irish in their second game with a simple win, whilst Wales performed the impressive feat of beating Scotland on their home turf with a hard-won 1–0 success. The final games were tensely contested, as Wales, hoping for an England failure at Hampden Park in their final game took the play to the Irish and ran out 3–0 winners. In Glasgow between England and Scotland, the tournament was decided by two Stan Pearson goals which gave England the victory and their half of the trophy. Had goal difference been used at this time to further separate the teams, then Wales would have won a rare individual victory, but this method of scoring was not introduced to the British Home Championship until the Seventies.

Table

Results

References

1951
1951–52 in Northern Ireland association football
1951–52 in English football
1951–52 in Scottish football
1951–52 in Welsh football
1952 in British sport
1951 in British sport